Aude is a department in south-central France named after the river.

Aude  may refer to:
 Aude (river), a river of southwestern France, after which the department is named
 the former Catholic Diocese of Aude during the revolutionary republic
 Lac d'Aude, a lake of southwestern France
 unrelated 
 Aude, Estonia, a village in Nissi Parish, Harju County
 9117 Aude, a main-belt asteroid discovered in 1997

People 
 Joseph Aude (1755–1841), French writer
 Aude (writer) (born 1947), the pen name of Canadian writer Claudette Charbonneau-Tissot
 Jorge Aude (born 1946), Uruguayan former football player and manager
 Susan Audé (born 1952), American television news anchor
 Dave Audé (born 1969), American producer, house DJ and remixer
 Rich Aude (born 1971), American former Major League Baseball player
 Erik Audé (born 1980), American actor, stuntman, and professional poker player

 Fictional
 Aude (character), the sister of Oliver and betrothed of Roland in "The Song of Roland" and other chansons de gestes

See also 
 Audes, France
  ("dare to be wise"), a Latin phrase